Henry Henderson (May 1, 1905 – August 8, 1980) was an American Negro league first baseman in the 1930s.

A native of Hamilton County, Tennessee, Henderson was the younger brother of fellow Negro leaguer Leonard Henderson. He played for the Nashville Elite Giants in 1932. Henderson died in Chattanooga, Tennessee in 1980 at age 75.

References

External links
 and Seamheads

1905 births
1980 deaths
Nashville Elite Giants players
Baseball first basemen
Baseball players from Tennessee
People from Hamilton County, Tennessee
20th-century African-American sportspeople